Khurramzamin (formerly Farmonkurgon) is a village and jamoat in north-western Tajikistan. It is located in Spitamen District in Sughd Region. The jamoat has a total population of 6,246.

References

Populated places in Sughd Region
Jamoats of Tajikistan